George Collier Robbins (September 1, 1823 – ) served as mayor of Portland, Oregon, from 1860 to 1861.  During his early life he lived and worked in various places, including Iowa, Ohio, Michigan, and St. Louis, Missouri.  He entered the jewelry business in St. Louis.  With his wife he began journeying west to California in 1851, reaching the state in April 1852.  Later the same year, they moved northward by steamship to Oregon, reaching Portland in October 1852, where they settled. He opened a watch and jewelry store on Front Street, later adding assaying to his business.

Robbins was elected mayor of Portland in April 1860.  His term ended in 1861, and in 1862 he moved to California, and was still living there, in San Diego, in October 1907. He died sometime between then and mid-1908.

References

1823 births
1900s deaths
19th-century American politicians
Mayors of Portland, Oregon
Place of birth missing
Year of death uncertain